The One Hundred is an English crossover band from London, combining elements of metalcore, punk, grime, rap and electronics. The band released their debut EP Subculture in 2014 via Australian independent label UNFD and have toured extensively across the United Kingdom and Europe as well as performing at major festivals such as Sonisphere, Download Festival and Reading and Leeds. In September 2016 the band announced via their social media that they had signed to Spinefarm Records, a division of Universal Music Group.

Their debut album Chaos + Bliss was released on 2 June 2017 and received positive reviews.

In July 2018 band announced via their social media that they have dissolved.

History
Initially the brainchild of vocalist Jacob Field and guitarist Tim Hider, The One Hundred began life as a writing/production project with neither member intending on performing the songs live themselves. As the songs developed it became apparent that there were no groups in existence that inhabited this specific sphere of music and accordingly the writing project became a band. Phil Kneller was recruited on bass, having formerly played alongside Field and Hider in metalcore outfit Collapse The Control, and in late 2013 Joe Balchin joined on drums. Balchin had previously played in notable Surrey band Open The Skies and prior to that in the band Fly This For Me alongside Hannah Greenwood who later went on to join the band Creeper.

In October 2013 the band launched their debut track "Breed". The track picked up early support from BBC Radio 1. Later, the band would go on to record a full session at Maida Vale Studios for the Radio 1 Rock Show. The band's second single "Kingsmen" followed in quick succession. The band went on to record a cover of Iggy Azalea's "Black Widow" in 2014. "Black Widow" was premiered on BBC Radio 1,

Their debut EP Subculture was released digitally through Australian label UNFD. The release was met with positive reviews, many citing that Field's "distinctive British accent" gave them a unique sound. Leading up to the EP's release the band joined British rap metal band Hacktivist on the Download Freezes Over tour.

Following the reviews received for the EP, The One Hundred went on to tour the United Kingdom with Papa Roach in March 2015 ahead of playing at Download Festival. They later toured with Eskimo Callboy before playing Reading and Leeds 2015. The band were then invited to play three UK arena shows with Mötley Crüe and wrapped up 2015 with a sizable tour with Japanese band Crossfaith - seeing the band tour mainland Europe for the first time. In 2016 the band played Slam Dunk Festival.

The band have released five music videos, "Kingsmen", "Downfall" "Unleashed" "Dark Matters" and "Monster". All five videos have received television support from Kerrang TV and Scuzz. "Unleashed" was released 20 October 2014.

On 6 February 2017 the band debuted their track 'Dark Matters'  on Daniel P. Carter's Radio One Rock Show from their forthcoming debut album. The second track be released from the album 'Monster' was also launched on the BBC Radio One Rock Show on 27 April 2017.

On 2 June 2017, the band released their debut album Chaos & Bliss.
The album is available as digital download, CD and vinyl.

On 26 July 2018, the band announced via their Facebook page that they have ceased activities as a band.

In June 2020 the band will posthumously be releasing a live EP recorded in 2015, it will be available digitally only with no planned physical release to accompany it.

Also in 2020 they released a cover of Black Widow originally by Iggy Azalea.

Critical reception
The One Hundred have received praise from several music critics and publications. In his review of the band's debut EP for Kerrang! James Mackinnon described the band's songs as "a hurricane of crowd slaying songs".  In his positive review, Luke Morton of Metal Hammer described the release as "full of rip roaring battle cries". Big Cheese went on to state that "The One Hundred will look back at Subculture as the EP that changed the game they are only just beginning".

Discography
Extended plays

Albums

Other Appearances

References

English heavy metal musical groups
Musical groups established in 2014
2014 establishments in England